Novolazarevskaya Station is a Russian, formerly Soviet, Antarctic research station. The station is located at Schirmacher Oasis, Queen Maud Land,  from the Antarctic coast, from which it is separated by Lazarev Ice Shelf. It was opened on January 18, 1961 by the 6th Soviet Antarctic Expedition. The maximum summer population is 70.

Novolazarevskaya has an airstrip (ICAO:AT17) that serves both research-related and commercial flights. In 2010 GLONASS differential reference station started to work in Novolazarevskaya. The reference station also provides Internet to Novolazarevskaya personnel.

Climate

Novo Runway

Famous Appendicectomy
Novolazarevskaya base is the site of perhaps the most famous surgery to remove an appendix ever undertaken.  In April 1961 Dr Leonid Ivanovich Rogozov the 27 year old surgeon performed an appendicectomy on himself after developing acute appendicitis.

See also 
 List of Antarctic research stations
 List of Antarctic field camps
 List of airports in Antarctica
 Soviet Antarctic Expedition
 Leonid Rogozov

References

External links 
 Official website Arctic and Antarctic Research Institute
 AARI Novolazarevskaya Station 
 GLONASS reference station was built in Novolazarevskaya Station
  • Antarctic facilities 
  • Antarctic facilities map

1961 establishments in Antarctica
Russia and the Antarctic
Outposts of Queen Maud Land
Soviet Union and the Antarctic
Princess Astrid Coast